Mário Calixto Filho (August 9, 1946 – June 17, 2020) was a Brazilian politician, journalist and businessman from the state of Minas Gerais who represented the state of Rondônia at national level.

Career
In 2004, Calixto took office as a senator representing the state of Rondônia due to a vacancy. Fellow senator Amir Lando left his position to be Minister of Social Security and Calixto, as his first suplente, took office as senator during his absence. His term went from July 13, 2004, to March 23, 2005.

Legal problems
On July 22, 2015, Calixto was arrested by the Federal Police of Brazil in Balneário Camboriú. He was convicted of government procurement fraud and was sentenced to 12 years in prison. At the time of his arrest, he was a fugitive from justice and had his name included on Interpol's wanted list.

in June 2017, he was convicted of money forgery and criminal association and sentenced to five years in jail.

Death
On June 17, 2020, Calixto died in Porto Velho at the age of 73 due to complications brought on by COVID-19 during the COVID-19 pandemic in Brazil, which he acquired while in prison.

References

1946 births
2020 deaths
Members of the Federal Senate (Brazil)
Rondônia politicians
Brazilian Democratic Movement politicians
Brazilian politicians convicted of crimes
People from Minas Gerais
Deaths from the COVID-19 pandemic in Rondônia